Pilot Officer John Samuel Bryson (1913? – 1940), called "Butch",  was a Canadian fighter pilot who flew with the Royal Air Force during the Battle of Britain.

Bryson, the son John T. Bryson and Marion Elphinstone Bryson, was born in Westmount an enclave of Montreal, Quebec, Canada. Prior to the war he was a member of the Royal Canadian Mounted Police, but bought his way out  in order to serve in defense of Britain.

In January 1939 he joined the Royal Air Force on a short service commission. Upon completion of his flying training at No. 13 Flying Training school at RAF Drem, he was posted to No. 92 Squadron RAF.  He joined the squadron at RAF Tangmere on 10 October 1939. He had one 'kill',  an He 111 over Dunkirk on 2 June 1940, and shared a kill on 24 July 1940 of a Junkers Ju 88 over the Bristol Channel. 
Flying with the 92d out of Biggin Hill, joining two other squadrons in a Big Wing group, on 24 September 1940, in response to a ten Ju 88 medium bomber attack, defended by over one-hundred 109s, Bryson was "last seen making a solo attack on a large formation of Me 109s". He was shot down and killed, his Spitfire, X4037, crashing and burning out near North Weald.  Butch Bryson was 27 years old. He was buried in St Andrew's Church, North Weald Bassett, Essex.

References 

The Few
1940 deaths
Royal Air Force officers
Royal Canadian Mounted Police officers
Year of birth missing
Royal Air Force pilots of World War II
Royal Air Force personnel killed in World War II
Aviators killed by being shot down
People from Westmount, Quebec
Canadian military personnel from Quebec